"Play Around" is the lead single released from Lil' Cease's debut album, The Wonderful World of Cease A Leo. The song was produced by Bink (then known as Bink Dogg) and featured Lil' Kim, Joe Hooker and Mr. Bristal. It is Lil Cease's only single.

The song was a hit on the Billboard Hot Rap Singles chart, peaking at number nine, though it was only a minor success on the R&B chart and did not reach the Billboard Hot 100. Nonetheless, it was the most successful single that Cease released during his short-lived solo career and reached the Billboard Year-End charts as one of the years most successful rap singles.

The music video was included as a bonus feature on the VHS release for Todd McFarlane's Spawn 3: The Ultimate Battle.

Single track listing
"Play Around" (Rufftime Radio Remix) - 3:59
"Play Around" (Clean Radio Version) - 4:27
"Play Around" (Album Version) - 4:27
"Play Around" (Rufftime Remix Video Version) - 4:11

Chart history

Peak positions

Year-End charts

References

1999 singles
1999 songs
Atlantic Records singles
Songs written by Lil' Kim